The Goebbels Gap is an Internet adage defined as the amount of time between a negative event in the world and when someone blames it on the Jews. Promulgated by the American writer Yair Rosenberg, then a senior writer at Tablet Magazine, in 2019, it seen as a proof point of seemingly every conspiracy eventually targeting the Jews. It is named for Nazi chief propagandist Joseph Goebbels, who engineered the Third Reich's deeply virulent anti-Semitic propaganda.

Rosenberg has cited as examples of the Goebbels Gap the 10 day period between the September 11 attacks and when anti-Semitic conspiracy theories began to emerge of Israel's culpability in the attacks, and Iranian President Hasan Rouhani claiming Israel supported the Islamic State in 2019.

See also
 List of eponymous laws
 Nazi analogies
 Antisemitism

References

Adages
Eponyms
Internet culture
Internet terminology
Nazi analogies
Political Internet memes
Antisemitic canards
Joseph Goebbels